Jane Sherron De Hart (born 1936) is an American feminist historian and women's studies academic. She is a professor emerita at University of California, Santa Barbara. De Hart has authored and edited several works on the history of women in the United States, the Federal Theatre Project, the Equal Rights Amendment, and Ruth Bader Ginsburg. During the 1970s, she founded the women's studies program at the University of North Carolina at Greensboro.

Early life and education 
De Hart was born in Asheville, North Carolina and raised in Bryson City, North Carolina. She graduated with a degree in history from Duke University. On a Carnegie Fellowship, De Hart earned a Ph.D. at Duke University in 1967. She married while attending graduate school and moved to Princeton, New Jersey where she continued work on her dissertation and taught at Douglass College. Her dissertation on the Federal Theatre Project became her first book.

Career 
In 1970, De Hart joined University of North Carolina at Greensboro for ten years, first temporarily before becoming permanent professor and founding the women's studies program. She was co-bicentennial chair of American studies at University of Helsinki from 1981 to 1982. De Hart became a professor of history and director of women's studies at University of North Carolina at Chapel Hill.

In 1992, De Hart joined the University of California, Santa Barbara.

In 2018, De Hart published Ruth Bader Ginsburg: A Life. It was the first full-length biography of Ginsburg.

Awards and honors 
De Hart was a fellow of the National Endowment for the Humanities in 1975 and 1998. In 1991, she was awarded the Victoria Schuck Award alongside Donald G. Mathews for their book on the intersection of the Equal Rights Amendment and sex, gender, and politics.

Selected works

References

External links 
 

1936 births
Living people
Writers from Asheville, North Carolina
People from Bryson City, North Carolina
Feminist historians
American feminist writers
20th-century American historians
21st-century American biographers
American women biographers
Duke University alumni
University of North Carolina at Greensboro faculty
University of North Carolina at Chapel Hill faculty
University of California, Santa Barbara faculty
20th-century American women writers
21st-century American women writers
Women's studies academics
Fellows of the National Endowment for the Humanities